Transmembrane protein 39B (TMEM39B) is a protein that in humans is encoded by the gene TMEM39B. TMEM39B is a multi-pass membrane protein with eight transmembrane domains. The protein localizes to the plasma membrane and vesicles. The precise function of TMEM39B is not yet well-understood by the scientific community, but differential expression is associated with survival of B cell lymphoma, and knockdown of TMEM39B is associated with decreased autophagy in cells infected with the Sindbis virus. Furthermore, the TMEM39B protein been found to interact with the SARS-CoV-2 ORF9C (also known as ORF14) protein. TMEM39B is expressed at moderate levels in most tissues, with higher expression in the testis, placenta, white blood cells, adrenal gland, thymus, and fetal brain.

Gene 
The TMEM39B gene in humans is located on the plus strand at 1p35.2. The gene is composed of 14 exons and covers 30.8 kb, spanning from 32,072,031 to 32,102,866. It is flanked by KHDRBS1 upstream and KPNA6 downstream. The TMEM39B gene region also contains the microRNA-encoding gene MIR5585.

Transcript 
There are four validated transcript variants for TMEM39B produced by different promoters and alternative splicing. Transcript variant 1 is translated into the longest and most abundant protein isoform.

Protein

Isoforms 
There are three validated protein isoforms for TMEM39B. Isoform 1 is the longest and the other two isoforms use a downstream in-frame start codon.

General properties 
The human TMEM39B protein isoform 1 is composed of 492 amino acids and has a predicted molecular weight of 56 kDa. The basal isoelectric point (pI) of the protein is 9.51. Compared to the composition of the human proteome, TMEM39B has a higher percentage of serine, histidine, and leucine and a lower percentage of glutamate and aspartate, making it basic overall. It contains two pairs of tandem repeats: “GSSG” from amino acids 21–28 and “PPSH” from amino acids 107–114. There is a periodic motif of four leucines spaced seven residues apart from amino acids 168–195, which is not predicted to form a leucine zipper. There is an “F..Y” motif with three repeats from amino acids 183-202 and a motif of phenylalanine at every other residue from amino acids 409–416.  There are no notable charge clusters, charge runs, or spacings, nor are there any sorting signals.

Topology 
TMEM39B isoform 1 contains eight transmembrane regions, and the N-terminus and C-terminus are predicted to be located in the cytosol.

Regulation

Gene-level regulation

Promoter 

TMEM39B has several promoter regions predicted by GenoMatix ElDorado. Most promoters are overlapping in a similar region, where use of a different promoter would only cause skipping of the first exon.

Transcription factors 
The promoter of TMEM39B transcript variant 1 contains numerous transcription factor binding sites. The transcription factors SMARCA3, TLX1, and CMYB have binding sites with high affinity near the binding site of transcription factor IIB, so they are potential regulators of gene transcription.

Expression pattern 
RNA sequencing data show that TMEM39B is expressed in all tissues types, with higher levels in the testis, placenta, white blood cells, adrenal gland, thymus, and fetal brain. Microarray data show that TMEM39B is expressed at moderate levels in most tissues, on average in the 58th percentile of genes expressed in a given tissue sample. By percentile rank, TMEM39B is most highly expressed with respect to other genes in BDCA4+ dendritic cells, CD19+ B-cells, and CD14+ monocytes.

Transcript-level regulation

miRNA binding sites 
The 3' UTR of the TMEM39B protein contains binding sites for the miRNAs miR-1290, miR-4450, and miRNA-520d-5p. Binding of these miRNAs may lead to RNA silencing.

mRNA-binding proteins 
The RNA-binding proteins SFRS13A, ELAVL1, and KHDRBS3 have binding sites in the 3' UTR, and the proteins KHSRP, SFRS9 and YBX1 have binding sites in the 5' UTR.

Secondary structure 
The predicted secondary structure of the 5' and 3' UTR of TMEM39B contains multiple stem-loops which may play a role in stability and binding.

Protein-level regulation

Post-translational modifications 

The TMEM39B protein contains numerous sites of predicted post-translational modifications, including phosphorylation, SUMOylation, acetylation, and glycosylation. Sites of predicted S-palmitoylation at Cys13, Cys87, and Cys264 are conserved in orthologs. SUMOylation is predicted at Lys279 and Lys359. Several well-conserved sites of phosphorylation, glycation, and O-linked-N-acetylglucosaminylation are predicted in cytosolic regions of the protein, as annotated on the conceptual translation of TMEM39B transcript variant 1.

Sub-cellular localization 
The TMEM39B protein has been found to localize to the vesicles using immunohistochemistry.

Homology and Evolution

Paralogs 
The human TMEM39B gene has a paralog called TMEM39A, also referred to by the alias SUSR2 (suppressor of SQST-1 aggregates in rpl-43 mutants), which is located at 3q13.33. The TMEM39A protein contains 488 amino acids and shares 51.2% identity with TMEM39B. Although the function of the paralog TMEM39A is not well-understood, variants are associated with greater risk of autoimmune disease. The paralog TMEM39A has also been found to interact with Encephalomyocarditis virus (EMCV) capsid proteins as a regulator of the viral autophagy pathway.

Orthologs 
TMEM39B has orthologs in species as distant as cartilaginous fish. Mammalian orthologs are highly similar to human TMEM39B, with percent identity greater than 85%. In orthologs in birds, reptiles, and amphibians, the percent identity to human TMEM39B ranges between 70% and 85%. In fish, the percent identity ranges from 40% to 75%. TMEM39B is only conserved in vertebrates, but the paralog TMEM39A has orthologs in species as distant as arthropods. A selected list of orthologs from NCBI BLAST is displayed below.

Evolution 
The TMEM39B gene appears most distantly in cartilaginous fish (chondrichthyes), which diverged from humans approximately 465 million years ago. Orthologs of the paralog TMEM39A are found in arthropods, which diverged from humans approximately 763 million years ago, suggesting that TMEM39B was produced by the duplication of an ancestral form of TMEM39A .

TMEM39B evolves at a relatively slow rate; a 1% change in the amino acid sequence requires approximately 13.9 million years. Based on sequence similarity of orthologs, TMEM39B evolves approximately 1.5 times faster than cytochrome c and 7 times slower than fibrinogen alpha.

Interacting proteins

Immune proteins 
Using co-immunoprecipitation, affinity capture MS, and two-hybrid screens, the TMEM39B protein has been found to interact with various membrane glycoproteins . Many interacting proteins have immune functions, including IL13RA1 (interleukin-13 receptor subunit alpha-1), KLRD1 (killer cell lectin-like receptor subfamily D, member 1), and SEMA7A (semaphorin-7A). SEMA7A acts as an activator of T cells and monocytes, while KLDR1 encodes an antigen presented on natural killer cells. IL13RA1 has been proposed to mediate JAK-STAT signaling, which regulates immune cell activation.

SARS-CoV-2 
The TMEM39B protein interacts with the SARS-CoV-2 ORF9c accessory protein, also sometimes referred to as ORF14. ORF9C is located within the nucleocapsid (N) gene, overlapping with ORF9b.  Two mutations in OFC9c resulting in premature stop codons have been observed in SARS-CoV-2 isolates, suggesting that this reading frame is dispensable for viral replication. The ORF9c protein has been shown to localize to vesicles when transfected into HeLa cells and is predicted to have a non-cytoplasmic domain and transmembrane domain.

Variants 
Many SNPs (single nucleotide polymorphisms) have been detected in the TMEM39B gene, of which a smaller subset cause nonsynonymous amino acid changes. There are notably fewer SNPs that occur at sites of post-translational modifications, motifs, or highly conserved amino acids; changes in these amino acids may be more likely to have phenotypic effects. The table below lists selected SNPs resulting in a change at such sites.

Clinical significance 
In a study using 164 tumor samples from patients with diffuse large B cell lymphoma, TMEM39B was one of 17 genes identified as part of a prognostic profile for 5-year progression-free survival. In another study using a genome-wide siRNA screen, knockdown of TMEM39B with siRNAs decreased viral capsid/autophagosome colocalization, survival of virus-infected cells, and mitophagy in HeLa cells infected with Sindbis virus. This may suggest that TMEM39B plays a role in viral autophagy like its paralog TMEM39A.

References

Impact of the COVID-19 pandemic on other health issues